The 2000 New Ireland earthquakes occurred off the coast of New Ireland Province, Papua New Guinea on November 16 and 17.

The mainshock was a magnitude 8.0 Mw strike-slip event that occurred on November 16 at 04:54 UTC, and ruptured a section of the transform boundary between the north and south Bismarck plates.

This sequence of earthquakes killed two people, and triggered landslides in southern New Ireland. Damage caused by the events and the following tsunami occurred in New Britain, Duke of York Island, western Bougainville and Buka. The magnitude 8.0 event was the largest earthquake to occur in the world during 2000.

Tectonic setting
The earthquake sequence occurred in an area of complex tectonics caused by the continuing collision between the Pacific Plate and the Australian Plate. In addition to the major plates, several smaller plates are recognised. The South Bismarck Plate is moving southeastward relative to the Pacific Plate (or another microplate) and its northern boundary in the Bismarck Sea is made up of segments that are alternately extensional and sinistral transform in type. At its eastern end, where it runs close to New Ireland, this boundary is formed by the Weitin Fault, although it is unclear whether that fault is just one of the structures that carries the plate motion. Depending on assumptions, this part of the boundary accommodates 134–139 mm per year of relative plate motion. The southern boundary of the Bismarck Sea Plate is formed by a convergent boundary where oceanic crust of the Solomon Sea Plate is subducting northwards along the New Britain Trench, forming the New Britain island arc. It is unclear how these two boundaries link together, as the Weitin Fault becomes difficult to trace southeast of New Ireland. To the southeast, the New Britain Trench links to the Solomon Islands Trench along which the Solomon Sea Plate subducts beneath the Pacific Plate.

Earthquake sequence
The first of the large earthquakes in the sequence occurred at 04:54 on 16 November, and is regarded as the mainshock, although the two later events are unusually large for aftershocks and occurred on different fault systems with different focal mechanisms. The mainshock had a magnitude in the range  8.0–8.2, and was mainly strike-slip in type, although some component of dip-slip has been noted, particularly towards the southeastern end of the rupture. Strike-slip movement was observed along the onshore part of the Weitin Fault on New Ireland, with a maximum displacement of 5 m. A rupture length of about 100–120 km has been estimated for this earthquake.

The second large shock in the sequence occurred about three hours after the mainshock, at 07:42 on 16 November. This earthquake had a magnitude in the range  7.3–7.8 and was of thrust type, most likely caused by rupture of the plate boundary interface in the New Britain Trench subduction zone. An analysis of Coulomb stress transfer after the mainshock suggest that there was a major increase in static stress along that part of the plate boundary.

The final large shock in the sequence occurred on the following day at 21:01 on 17 November. This earthquake had a magnitude in the range  7.3–7.8 and was also of thrust type along another part of the same plate boundary as the second shock. Only a small increase in static stress has been modelled for the combined effects of the earlier two large earthquakes in the sequence.

Tsunami
Significant tsunami waves were observed on the islands of Duke of York, Bougainville and Buka (2.5–3.0 m) and on the southern coast of New Ireland (3.0 m at Lamassa). Run-ups of a metre were noted on the Trobriand Islands and on Gizo and Noro of the Solomon Islands. The tsunami was also recorded by tide gauges on the Marshall Islands and Vanuatu.

Modelling of tsunamis generated by the mainshock and the first large aftershock are consistent with the observed run-ups. The mainshock, despite its mainly strike-slip nature appears to be the cause of the tsunami observed on New Ireland. The reason that the mainshock generated a tsunami may either be due to the change to a more dip-slip type motion at the southeastern end of the rupture or a result of lateral movement on the relatively steep bathymetric slope in that area. The effects on Bougainville match those modelled for the first large aftershock.

Damage
The mainshock was associated with widespread damage on Duke of York and in parts of New Ireland and New Britain, particularly from landslides. The triggered tsunami caused further damage on Bougainville, destroying houses and leaving 200 people homeless and at Lamassa  on New Ireland where a hundred homes and a church were destroyed. Two people died as a result of the mainshock, one on Duke of York and one on New Ireland.

See also 
List of earthquakes in 2000
List of earthquakes in Papua New Guinea

References

External links
Preliminary Results of Rupture Process for November 16, 2000 New Ireland Region, Papua New Guinea Earthquake

New Ireland
2000 disasters in Papua New Guinea
2000 New Ireland
November 2000 events in Oceania
Earthquakes in Papua New Guinea
Tsunamis in Papua New Guinea
Earthquake clusters, swarms, and sequences
New Ireland Province